The 26th General Assembly of Prince Edward Island was in session from March 4, 1874, to July 1, 1876. It was the first assembly after Prince Edward Island became a Canadian province. The majority party was the Conservative Party led by Premier James Colledge Pope. After Pope resigned to run for a federal seat, Lemuel Owen became party leader and premier.

There were three sessions of the 26th General Assembly:

Cornelius Howatt was elected speaker.

Members

Notes:

External links 
  Election results for the Prince Edward Island Legislative Assembly, 1873-04-01
 Prince Edward Island, garden province of Canada, WH Crosskill (1904)

Terms of the General Assembly of Prince Edward Island
1874 establishments in Prince Edward Island
1876 disestablishments in Prince Edward Island